Frederick Reiken (born 1966) is an American author from Livingston, New Jersey He has published three novels to critical acclaim, and he teaches creative writing at Emerson College.

Early life and education 
Reiken was born in New Jersey in 1966, and he attended the Pingry School. He earned a B.A. in Biology at Princeton University in 1988, where for his senior thesis he researched the behavioral ecology of island feral horses. He earned an M.F.A. at the University of California, Irvine, in 1992.

Reiken is married and has two daughters.

Career 

Reiken began thinking of himself as a writer after a poetry class at Princeton with J. D. McClatchy. In addition, Paul Auster's introductory fiction course and John McPhee's "Literature of Fact" course encouraged him to follow both his passions, science and writing. Following graduation in 1988, he went to the Negev desert as a wildlife biology researcher studying the population dynamics of Persian onagers, a species of wild ass.

After completing his M.F.A., in 1992–1993 he was an artist-in-residence and then assistant director at Cummington Community of the Arts.

From 1992 to 1998, he was a reporter, nature writer, and columnist at the Daily Hampshire Gazette. In 1997 he published his first novel.

In 1992, he began writing sketches that would eventually become his second novel, published in 2000. His third novel was published in 2010.

Reiken's essays and short stories have been published in The New Yorker, Western Humanities Review, Glimmer Train, and The Writer's Chronicle.

Since 1999, Reiken has taught creative writing at Emerson College in Boston.

Critical response 
Reiken's first novel, The Odd Sea (1998), won the Hackney Literary Award and was selected one of the best first novels of the year by Library Journal and Booklist. Jane Vandenburgh of The New York Times said the novel covers "mainly psychological terrain", of a family "who must somehow cope with the mysterious disappearance of the oldest son, 16-year-old Ethan...which eloquently remind us that the unfathomable can indeed happen, that the unbearable must be bravely withstood". Judith Rosen wrote it is "a contemporary tale of loss based loosely on The Odyssey". Christopher Lehmann-Haupt said it is "a haunting first novel that takes a horrifying family calamity and turns it into a form of magic... [Reiken] has skillfully balanced this pain against the hopefulness of the narrator."

Reiken's second novel, The Lost Legends of New Jersey (2000), was listed on The New York Times "Notable Book" list. Critic Gary Krist wrote, "Whether he's depicting the mournful uneasiness of two siblings on a last moonlit bike ride or the bewilderment of an estranged father giving himself over to the healing power of a Jacques Cousteau special, Reiken knows how to charge the quietest domestic scenes with consequence and emotion."

His third novel, Day for Night (2010), was favorably reviewed by Patrick Ness of The Guardian, who wrote it is "a portmanteau novel: discrete stories from different points of view that combine to tell a larger narrative". S. Kirk Walsh of The Los Angeles Times wrote, "A thought-provoking, intricate portrait of the far-reaching, intergenerational implications of the Holocaust —and how fortuitous circumstances can bring people from both sides of a tragedy closer together, and, in some cases, further apart."

Awards and honors 

 1997 Hackney Award for First Novel, The Odd Sea
 2000 New York Times Notable Books of the Year, The Lost Legends of New Jersey
 2000 Los Angeles Times Best Books of the Year, The Lost Legends of New Jersey
 2010 Finalist for the Los Angeles Times, Book Prize, Day for Night
 Best novels of 2010, The Washington Post, Day for Night

References

External links 

 
 NPR interview with Scott Simon, May 8, 2010

1966 births
20th-century births
Living people
20th-century American male writers
21st-century American male writers
20th-century American novelists
21st-century American novelists
American male novelists
Emerson College faculty
Novelists from Massachusetts
People from Livingston, New Jersey
Pingry School alumni
Princeton University alumni
University of California, Irvine alumni